The Valley of the Shadow is a digital history project about the American Civil War, launched in 1993 and hosted by the University of Virginia.  It details the experiences of Confederate soldiers from Augusta County, Virginia and Union soldiers from Franklin County, Pennsylvania, United States.

Project founders William G. Thomas III and Edward L. Ayers referred to it as "an applied experiment in digital scholarship." The site contains scanned copies of four newspapers from each of the counties in addition to those of surrounding cities such as Richmond and New York: the Staunton Spectator (Staunton, Virginia; Whig), the Republican Vindicator (Staunton, Virginia; Democratic), the Franklin Repository and Transcript (Chambersburg, Pennsylvania; Republican), and the Valley Spirit (Chambersburg, Pennsylvania; Democratic). Elsa A. Nystrom and Justin A. Nystrom state about the site:

In 2022, on the 30th anniversary of the project, New American History released an updated version of the Valley of the Shadow with enhanced images and search features.

References

Further reading
 Alkalimat, Abdul, The African American Experience in Cyberspace: A Resource Guide to the Best Web Sites on Black Culture and History
 Serge Noiret: "La "nuova storiografia digitale" negli Stati Uniti, (1999-2004)." in Memoria e Ricerca, n.18, January–April 2005, pp.169-185, URL: .
 Serge Noiret: "Y a t-il une Histoire Numérique 2.0 ?" in Les historiens et l'informatique. Un métier à réinventer, edited by Jean-Philippe Genet and Andrea Zorzi, Rome: Ecole Française de Rome, 2011.

External links
 The Valley of the Shadow - original website
 The Valley of the Shadow - updated website

Educational institutions in the United States with year of establishment missing
Information technology projects
Virginia in the American Civil War
Pennsylvania in the American Civil War
History websites of the United States
University of Virginia
Chambersburg, Pennsylvania
Digital history projects
Digital humanities projects